Gibberula martingaiteae is a species of sea snail, a marine gastropod mollusk, in the family Cystiscidae. It is named after Spanish writer Carmen Martín Gaite.

Distribution
This species occurs in Guadeloupe.

References

martingaiteae
Gastropods described in 2015